Eois flavotaeniata is a moth in the  family Geometridae. It is found in Chile.

References

Moths described in 1895
Eois
Moths of South America
Endemic fauna of Chile